This is a list of Persian-language television channels organized by country of origin, this list may include active and defunct channels.

Iran-based television channels 

AAA Music
Ariamehr TV
AAA Family
AAA Sports
AAA Plus
AFN TV
Appadana International
Arya TV
Arezo Tv
ATV
Azadi TV
Baran TV
Channel One
Channel Two
Didar Global TV
DidgahTV
EBC.1
Gem Music
Homa TV
ICC – Iranian Cinema Channel (media group)
IPN
Iran Music
IRAN-FMTV
Iranian Cinema Channel
IRAN-MNTV
IRIB TV1 (Iranian's Channel)
IRIB TV2 (Life Channel)
IRIB TV3 (Youth Channel)
IRIB TV4 (Educated People's Channel)
IRIB TV5/Tehran TV (Local Tehran Channel)
IRINN (News Channel)
IRIB Amoozesh (Education Channel)
IRIB Quran (Religion and Life Channel)
IRIB Mostanad (Documentary Channel)
IRIB Shoma (Cultural Channel)
IRIB Namayesh (Movie and TV Series Channel)
IRIB Varzesh (Sports Channel)
IRIB Pooya & Nahal (Young Children Channel)
IRIB Salamat (Health and Fun Channel)
IRIB Tamasha (TV Series Channel)
IRIB Nasim (Fun and Entertainment Channel)
IRIB Ofogh (Cultural, Artistic and Social Channel)
IRIB Omid (Teenager Channel)
IRIB Iran Kala (Iran Goods Channel)
IFilm TV (Entertainment Network Which Consists of Four Channels in English, Arabic, Persian and Dari Language)
Jame Jam TV (Targeted to European, American and Asian/Oceanian Audiences)
Sahar TV (Multiple Languages)
HispanTV (Spanish Language News Channel)
Press TV (English Language News Channel)
Al-Alam News Network (Arabic Language News Channel) 
Al-Kawthar TV (Arabic Channel)
IRIB Sahand TV
IRIB Azerbaijan TV
IRIB Sabalan TV
IRIB Eshragh TV
IRIB Alborz TV
IRIB Aflak TV
IRIB Aftab TV
IRIB Baran TV
IRIB Bushehr TV
IRIB Dena TV
IRIB Esfahan TV
IRIB Fars TV
IRIB Sabz TV
IRIB Hamoon TV
IRIB Ilam TV
IRIB Jahanbin TV
IRIB Kerman TV
IRIB Zagros TV
IRIB Khalije Fars TV
IRIB Khoozestan TV
IRIB Khavaran TV
IRIB Khorasan Razavi TV
IRIB Atrak TV
IRIB Kordestan TV
IRIB Noor TV
IRIB Qazvin TV
IRIB Semnan TV
IRIB Hamedan TV
IRIB Taban TV
IRIB Tabarestan TV
IRIB Abadan TV
IRIB Mahabad TV
IRIB Kish TV
Kahkeshan TV
Komala TV
Live Channel
Me chef tv
MIFA
National Iranian Television (NITV)
Nejat TV
New Channel TV
Payam TV
PEN
Persian News Network (PNN)
Rahe Farda TV
Rang-a-Rang TV
Saba TV Network
Salaam TV
seVen
Shabakeh 7
Shamshad TV
Tamadon TV
Tamasha International Network
TV4Persia
TM
TV 1
YourTV

United Kingdom-based television channels 

 BBC Persian Television (United Kingdom, 2009)
 BBC World News (United Kingdom)
Iran International (United Kingdom, 2017)
KalemehTV (United Kingdom)
Manoto 1 (London, 2010)
Manoto 2 (London, 2010–2011)

United States-based television channels 

Andisheh TV (Los Angeles, 2006–2017)
 IRTV (Los Angeles, 1981–?)
 Jaam-e-Jam (Los Angeles, early 1980s–2017)
MTC (television) (California)
Omid-e-Iran OITN (Tarzana, California; 1995–present)
Pars TV (United States)
Persian Broadcasting Company or "Tapesh" (California, 1989–2016?)
Radio Javan TV (United States, 2017)
Royal Time TV (United States)

Other foreign-based television channels 

Al Arabiya Persian Online (Dubai, UAE, 2003)
GEM TV (Dubai, 2006)
ITN1 (Canada)
ITN2 (Canada)
Farsi1 (Afghanistan, News Corp, 2009)
MBC Persia (Dubai, UAE, 2008)
Nour TV (Dubai, UAE, 2010)
Mohajer International TV (Germany)
Negin TV (Canada, 2014)
Persian Music Channel (Dubai)
Simaye Azadi / Iran National TV (Europe, 1987)

The list of networks overseas Islamic Republic of Iran Broadcasting is also available.

See also

 Lists of television channels
 Television in Afghanistan
 Television in Iran

References 

Persian

+